Caves is a commune in the Aude department in southern France, it extends over an area of 9.13 km2. In 2010 the commune had 692 inhabitants..

Population

See also
 Fitou AOC
 Corbières AOC
 Communes of the Aude department

References

Communes of Aude
Aude communes articles needing translation from French Wikipedia